Mountain Village may refer to:

Mountain Village, Alaska, city in Kusilvak Census Area
Mountain Village, Colorado, a home rule municipality in San Miguel County
Shanzhai, sometimes translated as "mountain village", a Chinese term for counterfeit goods